One-repetition maximum (one rep maximum or 1RM) in weight training is the maximum amount of weight that a person can possibly lift for one repetition. It may also be considered as the maximum amount of force that can be generated in one maximal contraction. One repetition maximum can be used for determining an individual's maximum strength and is the method for determining the winner in events such as powerlifting and weightlifting competitions. One repetition maximum can also be used as an upper limit, in order to determine the desired "load" for an exercise (as a percentage of the 1RM).

Calculating 1RM

The 1RM can either be calculated directly using maximal testing or indirectly using submaximal estimation. The submaximal estimation method is preferred as it is safer, quicker, and less unnerving for inexperienced exercisers; however, it may underestimate the actual 1RM.
One rep maximum calculators are used to predict a one rep maximum lift. The degree of accuracy can vary largely depending on the weight training experience and muscular composition of the athlete. Also, most one rep maximum calculators are designed for seasoned strength trainers, and those with little experience may find their actual one rep maximum is much lower because their nervous system cannot handle the stress of a high weight. This test should be performed with a spotter for reasons of safety.

Weight training protocols often use 1RM when programming to ensure the exerciser reaches resistance overload, especially when the exercise objective is muscular strength, endurance or hypertrophy. By understanding the maximal potential of the muscle, it is possible to reach resistance overload by increasing the number of repetitions for an exercise.

Determining the 1 rep max can be done directly through trial and error and simply requires the exerciser to complete one full repetition with the maximum weight. 
There are several common formulas used to estimate 1RM using the submaximal method, the Epley and the Brzycki being the most common.

Epley formula

  assuming

Brzycki

This version of the one rep maximum calculation is often referred to as the Brzycki Formula after its creator, Matt Brzycki, and can be written either in terms

 

Formula 1 (Epley) and formula 2 (Brzycki) return identical results for 10 repetitions.  However, for fewer than 10 reps, formula 1 returns a slightly higher estimated maximum. For example, if a person can lift 100 pounds on a given exercise for 10 reps, the estimated one rep max would be 133 pounds for both formulae. However, if the person were to complete only 6 reps, then formula 1 would estimate a one rep maximum of approximately 120 pounds, while formula 2 would return an estimate of approximately 116 pounds.

These types of calculations may not always produce accurate results, but can be used as starting points. The weight can then be changed as needed to perform the number of reps called for by the training protocol.

Several more complex formulae have been proposed which use different coefficients for different rep numbers and sometimes even for different exercises.

Adams

Landers

Berger

Wathen

Mayhew et al.

O'Conner et al.

Baechle

Brown

Kemmler et al.

Lombardi

See also
Weight training

References

Further reading
 

Weight training